Currents in Biblical Research is a triannual peer-reviewed academic journal that covers the field of biblical studies. The associate editors are Catherine E. Bonesho (University of California, Los Angeles), Brad E. Kelle (Point Loma Nazarene University), and Drew Strait (Anabaptist Mennonite Biblical Seminary). Although the journal's first issue was released in 1993, Currents in Biblical Research  began publishing with SAGE Publications in 2002.

Abstracting and indexing 
The journal is abstracted and indexed in:
 Academic Search Premier
 ATLA Religion Database
 Index Theologicus
 Religion & Philosophy Collection
 Religious and Theological Abstracts

External links 
 

SAGE Publishing academic journals
English-language journals
Biblical studies journals
Triannual journals
Publications established in 2002